A console table is a table whose top surface is supported by corbels or brackets rather than by the usual four legs. It is thus similar to a supported shelf and is not designed to serve as a stand-alone surface. It is frequently used as  pier table (which may have legs of any variety), to abut a pier wall. 

The term console derives from the compound Latin verb consolor "to alleviate, lighten", from the verb solor, "to assuage, soothe, relieve, mitigate", plus the preposition con/com/cum, "with".

References

Tables (furniture)